In house lending is a type of seller financing in which a company or broker will help a customer obtain a loan at their place of business to purchase any product or services. When using in-house lending one does not have to rely on 3rd party company or business to complete the transaction.

In the real estate industry most home builders will use an in-house lender and often offer buyer incentives by processing the loan through their own mortgage company. In-house mortgage companies are sometimes scrutinized by other mortgage companies because outside or 3rd party mortgage companies cannot compete with their internal market rates or discount lending incentives that the builder offers.

Consumers can typically apply for in-house loans by visiting the business which is typically a brick and mortar. One can ask for special financing with the sales representative and they will usually direct him to see their lending specialist. There are some in-house lenders that are able to originate the transaction on-line for on-line buy here pay here dealerships and websites. At times it can be a challenge to discover who is actually using in-house lending or if they are using a bank, credit union on the back end to finance the transaction.

In the new car auto industry you will often find a finance manager or lending team that is willing to help find a funding bank to extend credit. For some used car dealerships they will often resort to funding the transaction by using their own business capital and payment coupon booklet to help a buyer who may not qualify through a traditional bank or finance company.

Caribbean Context - Trinidad and Tobago

In the English speaking Caribbean there are variations on this. In Trinidad and Tobago for instance there may be advertisements for in-house lending but what it amounts to is a sales agency for an established lender such as a commercial bank or credit union. Because of strict debt service requirements the ability of most to qualify for mortgage or vehicle loans are restricted.

This has given rise to buyers of property asking for rent to own type arrangements. This approach does not afford the buyer with all the legal benefits and protections of a mortgage. As a result, it is recommended that property buyers seek a seller that will issue a mortgage whilst still offering financing without the need for a financial intermediary.

References

Loans